The 1896–97 season of Scottish football was the 24th season of competitive football in Scotland and the seventh season of the Scottish Football League.

League competitions

Scottish Division One 

Hearts were champions of the Scottish Division One.

Scottish Division Two 

Partick Thistle won the Scottish Division Two. Both Linthouse and Port Glasgow Athletic had four points deducted.

Other honours

Cup honours

National

County

Non-league honours

Senior 
Highland League
 

Other Leagues

Scotland national team

Scotland were winners of the 1897 British Home Championship.

Key:
(H) = Home match
(A) = Away match
BHC = British Home Championship

Other national teams

Scottish League XI

See also
1896–97 Rangers F.C. season

Notes

References

External links
Scottish Football Historical Archive

 
Seasons in Scottish football